Trstěnice may refer to places in the Czech Republic:

Trstěnice (Cheb District), a municipality and village in the Karlovy Vary Region
Trstěnice (Svitavy District), a municipality and village in the Pardubice Region
Trstěnice (Znojmo District), a municipality and village in the South Moravian Region